Bai Jingting (born October 15, 1993) is a Chinese actor. He made his acting debut in the web series Back in Time (2014). He has since earned recognition for his roles in the television series The Whirlwind Girl (2016) and Rush to the Dead Summer (2017), the web series Reset (2022), and the film Yesterday Once More (2016).

Early life and education
Bai Jingting was born in Huairou district, Beijing, China of Manchu descent. While dedicated to music, he was also a field athlete in the shot put, long jump and high jump, as well as an avid basketballer in middle school, but barely got into high school due to poor grades. He studied at Capital Normal University's Music College, majoring in recording. Bai plays the piano, and achieved a grade of ten in the non-professional players' level assessment. He plays the guitar as well, as a hobby. During the academic year, he began his acting career in 2014.

12 November, 2022, Chinese paparazzi exposed Bai Jingting's romance with Song Yi. It is reported that Bai Jingting and Song Yi have already met Bai Jingting's parents.

Career

Beginnings and acting career
Bai made his debut in the youth web drama Back in Time (2014), adapted from the novel Cong Cong Na Nian by Chinese writer Jiu Yehui. He first gained attention for his performance as Yu Chuyuan in The Whirlwind Girl (2015), a youth sports drama based on the novel of the same name by Ming Xiaoxi.

In 2016, he made his film debut in the youth romance film Yesterday Once More. The same year, he gained increased popularity following his variety stint on Who's the Murderer.

In 2017, he starred in the youth melodrama Rush to the Dead Summer. The same year, he was cast in his first historical drama The Rise of Phoenixes.

In 2018, Bai was cast alongside Sun Yi in the romance drama Irreplaceable Love. This marks his first television leading role. Later in the year, he was cast in the Chinese remake of South Korean television series Misaeng, titled Ordinary Glory, as the titular character.
He starred in the sports drama Ping Pong playing a table tennis player.

In 2019, Bai ranked 72nd on Forbes China Celebrity 100 list.  Forbes China also listed Bai under their 30 Under 30 Asia 2019 list, which consisted of 30 influential people under 30 years old who have had a substantial effect in their fields.

In 2020, Bai starred in the military romance drama You Are My Hero as a police officer. He ranked 100th on Forbes China Celebrity 100 list.

In 2022, Bai starred in Reset as a video game designer Xiao Heyun , trapped in a time loop on a soon-to-explode bus.

Filmography

Film

Television series

Variety show

Discography

Awards

References

External links

Chinese male film actors
Chinese male television actors
21st-century Chinese male actors
1993 births
Living people
Male actors from Beijing
Manchu male actors